This is a list of Landing Craft Infantry (LCIs) built by the United States Navy.

 USS LCI(L)-1
 USS LCI(L)-2
 USS LCI(L)-3
 USS LCI(L)-4
 USS LCI(L)-5
 USS LCI(L)-8
 USS LCI(L)-9
 USS LCI(L)-10
 USS LCI(L)-11
 USS LCI(L)-12
 USS LCI(L)-13
 USS LCI(L)-14
 USS LCI(L)-15
 USS LCI(L)-16
 USS LCI(L)-17
 USS LCI(L)-18
 USS LCI(L)-19
 USS LCI(L)-20
 USS LCI(L)-21
 USS LCI(L)-22
 USS LCI(L)-23
 USS LCI(L)-24
 USS LCI(L)-25
 USS LCI(L)-26
 USS LCI(L)-27
 USS LCI(L)-28
 USS LCI(L)-29
 USS LCI(L)-30
 USS LCI(L)-31
 USS LCI(L)-32
 USS LCI(L)-33
 USS LCI(L)-34
 USS LCI(L)-35
 USS LCI(L)-36
 USS LCI(L)-37
 USS LCI(L)-38
 USS LCI(L)-39
 USS LCI(L)-40
 USS LCI(L)-41
 USS LCI(L)-42
 USS LCI(L)-43
 USS LCI(L)-44
 USS LCI(L)-45
 USS LCI(L)-46
 USS LCI(L)-47
 USS LCI(L)-48
 LCI(L)-49 to LCI(L)-60 - cancelled 6 November 1942
 USS LCI(L)-61
 USS LCI(L)-62
 USS LCI(L)-63
 USS LCI(L)-64
 USS LCI(L)-65
 USS LCI(L)-66
 USS LCI(L)-67
 USS LCI(L)-68
 USS LCI(L)-69
 USS LCI(L)-70
 USS LCI(L)-71
 USS LCI(L)-72
 USS LCI(L)-73
 USS LCI(L)-74
 USS LCI(L)-75
 USS LCI(L)-76
 USS LCI(L)-77
 USS LCI(L)-78
 USS LCI(L)-79
 USS LCI(L)-80
 USS LCI(L)-81
 USS LCI(L)-82
 USS LCI(L)-83
 USS LCI(L)-84
 USS LCI(L)-85
 USS LCI(L)-86
 USS LCI(L)-87
 USS LCI(L)-88
 USS LCI(L)-89
 USS LCI(L)-90
 USS LCI(L)-91
 USS LCI(L)-92
 USS LCI(L)-93
 USS LCI(L)-94
 USS LCI(L)-95
 USS LCI(L)-96
 LCI(L)-137 to LCI(L)-160 cancelled 31 October 1942
 USS LCI(L)-188
 USS LCI(L)-189
 USS LCI(L)-190
 USS LCI(L)-191
 USS LCI(L)-192
 USS LCI(L)-193
 USS LCI(L)-194
 USS LCI(L)-195
 USS LCI(L)-196
 LCI(L)-197 to LCI(L)-208 cancelled 5 November 1942
 USS LCI(L)-209
 USS LCI(L)-210
 USS LCI(L)-211
 USS LCI(L)-212
 USS LCI(L)-213
 USS LCI(L)-214
 USS LCI(L)-215
 USS LCI(L)-216
 USS LCI(L)-217
 USS LCI(L)-218
 USS LCI(L)-219
 USS LCI(L)-220
 USS LCI(L)-221
 USS LCI(L)-222
 USS LCI(L)-223
 USS LCI(L)-224
 USS LCI(L)-225
 USS LCI(L)-226
 USS LCI(L)-227
 USS LCI(L)-228
 USS LCI(L)-229
 USS LCI(L)-230
 USS LCI(L)-231
 USS LCI(L)-232
 USS LCI(L)-233
 USS LCI(L)-234
 USS LCI(L)-235
 USS LCI(L)-236
 USS LCI(L)-237
 USS LCI(L)-238
 USS LCI(L)-243
 USS LCI(L)-269
 USS LCI(L)-274
 USS LCI(L)-275
 USS LCI(L)-317
 USS LCI(L)-319
 USS LCI(L)-320
 USS LCI(L)-321
 USS LCI(L)-322
 USS LCI(L)-323
 USS LCI(L)-324
 USS LCI(L)-325
 USS LCI(L)-326
 USS LCI(L)-327
 USS LCI(L)-328
 USS LCI(L)-329
 USS LCI(L)-330
 USS LCI(L)-331
 USS LCI(L)-332
 USS LCI(L)-333
 USS LCI(L)-334
 USS LCI(L)-335
 USS LCI(L)-336
 USS LCI(L)-337
 USS LCI(L)-338
 USS LCI(L)-339
 USS LCI(L)-340
 USS LCI(L)-341
 USS LCI(L)-342
 USS LCI(L)-343
 USS LCI(L)-344
 USS LCI(L)-345
 USS LCI(L)-346
 USS LCI(L)-347
 USS LCI(L)-348
 USS LCI(L)-349
 USS LCI(L)-350
 USS LCI(L)-351
 USS LCI(L)-352
 USS LCI(L)-353
 USS LCI(L)-354
 USS LCI(L)-355
 USS LCI(L)-356
 USS LCI(L)-357
 USS LCI(L)-358
 USS LCI(L)-359
 USS LCI(L)-360
 USS LCI(L)-361
 USS LCI(L)-362
 USS LCI(L)-363
 USS LCI(L)-364
 USS LCI(L)-365
 USS LCI(L)-366
 USS LCI(L)-367
 USS LCI(L)-368
 USS LCI(L)-369
 USS LCI(L)-370
 USS LCI(L)-371
 USS LCI(L)-372
 USS LCI(L)-373
 USS LCI(L)-392
 USS LCI(L)-393
 USS LCI(L)-394
 USS LCI(L)-395
 USS LCI(L)-396
 USS LCI(L)-397
 USS LCI(L)-398
 USS LCI(L)-399
 USS LCI(L)-400
 USS LCI(L)-401
 USS LCI(L)-402
 USS LCI(L)-403
 USS LCI(L)-404
 USS LCI(L)-405
 USS LCI(L)-406
 USS LCI(L)-407
 USS LCI(L)-408
 USS LCI(L)-409
 USS LCI(L)-410
 USS LCI(L)-411
 USS LCI(L)-412
 USS LCI(L)-413
 USS LCI(L)-414
 USS LCI(L)-415
 USS LCI(L)-416
 USS LCI(L)-417
 USS LCI(L)-418
 USS LCI(L)-419
 USS LCI(L)-420
 USS LCI(L)-421
 USS LCI(L)-422
 USS LCI(L)-423
 USS LCI(L)-424
 USS LCI(L)-425
 USS LCI(L)-426
 USS LCI(L)-427
 USS LCI(L)-428
 USS LCI(L)-429
 USS LCI(L)-430
 USS LCI(L)-431
 USS LCI(L)-432
 USS LCI(L)-433
 USS LCI(L)-434
 USS LCI(L)-435
 USS LCI(L)-436
 USS LCI(L)-437
 USS LCI(L)-438
 USS LCI(L)-439
 USS LCI(L)-440
 USS LCI(L)-441
 USS LCI(L)-442
 USS LCI(L)-443
 USS LCI(L)-444
 USS LCI(L)-445
 USS LCI(L)-446
 USS LCI(L)-447
 USS LCI(L)-448
 USS LCI(L)-449
 USS LCI(L)-450
 USS LCI(L)-451
 USS LCI(L)-452
 USS LCI(L)-453
 USS LCI(L)-454
 USS LCI(L)-455
 USS LCI(L)-456
 USS LCI(L)-457
 USS LCI(L)-458
 USS LCI(L)-459
 USS LCI(L)-460
 USS LCI(L)-461
 USS LCI(L)-462
 USS LCI(L)-463
 USS LCI(L)-464
 USS LCI(L)-465
 USS LCI(L)-466
 USS LCI(L)-467
 USS LCI(L)-468
 USS LCI(L)-469
 USS LCI(L)-470
 USS LCI(L)-471
 USS LCI(L)-472
 USS LCI(L)-473
 USS LCI(L)-474
 USS LCI(L)-475
 USS LCI(L)-476
 USS LCI(L)-477
 USS LCI(L)-478
 USS LCI(L)-479
 USS LCI(L)-480
 USS LCI(L)-481
 USS LCI(L)-482
 USS LCI(L)-483
 USS LCI(L)-484
 USS LCI(L)-485
 USS LCI(L)-486
 USS LCI(L)-487
 USS LCI(L)-488
 USS LCI(L)-489
 USS LCI(L)-490
 USS LCI(L)-491
 USS LCI(L)-492
 USS LCI(L)-493
 USS LCI(L)-494
 USS LCI(L)-495
 USS LCI(L)-496
 USS LCI(L)-497
 USS LCI(L)-498
 USS LCI(L)-499
 USS LCI(L)-500
 USS LCI(L)-501
 USS LCI(L)-502
 USS LCI(L)-503
 USS LCI(L)-504
 USS LCI(L)-505
 USS LCI(L)-506
 USS LCI(L)-507
 USS LCI(L)-508
 USS LCI(L)-509
 USS LCI(L)-510
 USS LCI(L)-511
 USS LCI(L)-512
 USS LCI(L)-513
 USS LCI(L)-514
 USS LCI(L)-515
 USS LCI(L)-516
 USS LCI(L)-517
 USS LCI(L)-518
 USS LCI(L)-519
 USS LCI(L)-520
 USS LCI(L)-521
 USS LCI(L)-522
 USS LCI(L)-523
 USS LCI(L)-524
 USS LCI(L)-525
 USS LCI(L)-526
 USS LCI(L)-527
 USS LCI(L)-528
 USS LCI(L)-529
 USS LCI(L)-530
 USS LCI(L)-531
 USS LCI(L)-532
 USS LCI(L)-533
 USS LCI(L)-534
 USS LCI(L)-535
 USS LCI(L)-536
 USS LCI(L)-537
 USS LCI(L)-538
 USS LCI(L)-539
 USS LCI(L)-540
 USS LCI(L)-541
 USS LCI(L)-542
 USS LCI(L)-543
 USS LCI(L)-544
 USS LCI(L)-545
 USS LCI(L)-546
 USS LCI(L)-547
 USS LCI(L)-548
 USS LCI(L)-549
 USS LCI(L)-550
 USS LCI(L)-551
 USS LCI(L)-552
 USS LCI(L)-553
 USS LCI(L)-554
 USS LCI(L)-555
 USS LCI(L)-556
 USS LCI(L)-557
 USS LCI(L)-558
 USS LCI(L)-559
 USS LCI(L)-560
 USS LCI(L)-561
 USS LCI(L)-562
 USS LCI(L)-563
 USS LCI(L)-564
 USS LCI(L)-565
 USS LCI(L)-566
 USS LCI(L)-567
 USS LCI(L)-568
 USS LCI(L)-569
 USS LCI(L)-570
 USS LCI(L)-571
 USS LCI(L)-572
 USS LCI(L)-573
 USS LCI(L)-574
 USS LCI(L)-575
 USS LCI(L)-576
 USS LCI(L)-577
 USS LCI(L)-578
 USS LCI(L)-579
 USS LCI(L)-580
 USS LCI(L)-581
 USS LCI(L)-582
 USS LCI(L)-583
 USS LCI(L)-584
 USS LCI(L)-585
 USS LCI(L)-586
 USS LCI(L)-587
 USS LCI(L)-588
 USS LCI(L)-589
 USS LCI(L)-590
 USS LCI(L)-591
 USS LCI(L)-592
 USS LCI(L)-593
 USS LCI(L)-594
 USS LCI(L)-595
 USS LCI(L)-596
 USS LCI(L)-597
 USS LCI(L)-598
 USS LCI(L)-599
 USS LCI(L)-600
 USS LCI(L)-601
 USS LCI(L)-602
 USS LCI(L)-603
 USS LCI(L)-604
 USS LCI(L)-605
 USS LCI(L)-606
 USS LCI(L)-607
 USS LCI(L)-608
 USS LCI(L)-609
 USS LCI(L)-610
 USS LCI(L)-611
 USS LCI(L)-612
 USS LCI(L)-613
 USS LCI(L)-614
 USS LCI(L)-615
 USS LCI(L)-616
 USS LCI(L)-617
 USS LCI(L)-618
 USS LCI(L)-619
 USS LCI(L)-620
 USS LCI(L)-621
 USS LCI(L)-622
 USS LCI(L)-623
 USS LCI(L)-624
 USS LCI(L)-625
 USS LCI(L)-626
 USS LCI(L)-627
 USS LCI(L)-628
 USS LCI(L)-629
 USS LCI(L)-630
 USS LCI(L)-631
 USS LCI(L)-632
 USS LCI(L)-633
 USS LCI(L)-634
 USS LCI(L)-635
 USS LCI(L)-636
 USS LCI(L)-637
 USS LCI(L)-638
 USS LCI(L)-639
 USS LCI(L)-640
 USS LCI(L)-641
 USS LCI(L)-642
 USS LCI(L)-643
 USS LCI(L)-644
 USS LCI(L)-645
 USS LCI(L)-646
 USS LCI(L)-647
 USS LCI(L)-648
 USS LCI(L)-649
 USS LCI(L)-650
 USS LCI(L)-651
 USS LCI(L)-652
 USS LCI(L)-653
 USS LCI(L)-654
 USS LCI(L)-655
 USS LCI(L)-656
 USS LCI(L)-657
 USS LCI(L)-658
 USS LCI(L)-659
 USS LCI(L)-660
 USS LCI(L)-661
 USS LCI(L)-662
 USS LCI(L)-663
 USS LCI(L)-664
 USS LCI(L)-665
 USS LCI(L)-666
 USS LCI(L)-667
 USS LCI(L)-668
 USS LCI(L)-669
 USS LCI(L)-670
 USS LCI(L)-671
 USS LCI(L)-672
 USS LCI(L)-673
 USS LCI(L)-674
 USS LCI(L)-675
 USS LCI(L)-676
 USS LCI(L)-677
 USS LCI(L)-678
 USS LCI(L)-679
 USS LCI(L)-680
 USS LCI(L)-681
 USS LCI(L)-682
 USS LCI(L)-683
 USS LCI(L)-684
 USS LCI(L)-685
 USS LCI(L)-686
 USS LCI(L)-687
 USS LCI(L)-688
 USS LCI(L)-689
 USS LCI(L)-690
 USS LCI(L)-691
 USS LCI(L)-692
 USS LCI(L)-693
 USS LCI(L)-694
 USS LCI(L)-695
 USS LCI(L)-696
 USS LCI(L)-697
 USS LCI(L)-698
 USS LCI(L)-699
 USS LCI(L)-700
 USS LCI(L)-701
 USS LCI(L)-702
 USS LCI(L)-703
 USS LCI(L)-704
 USS LCI(L)-705
 USS LCI(L)-706
 USS LCI(L)-707
 USS LCI(L)-708
 USS LCI(L)-709
 USS LCI(L)-710
 USS LCI(L)-711
 USS LCI(L)-712
 USS LCI(L)-713
 USS LCI(L)-714
 USS LCI(L)-715
 USS LCI(L)-716
 LCI(L)-717 to LCI(L)-724 cancelled 19 August 1944
 USS LCI(L)-725
 USS LCI(L)-726
 USS LCI(L)-727
 USS LCI(L)-728
 USS LCI(L)-729
 USS LCI(L)-730
 USS LCI(L)-731
 USS LCI(L)-732
 USS LCI(L)-733
 USS LCI(L)-734
 USS LCI(L)-735
 USS LCI(L)-736
 USS LCI(L)-737
 USS LCI(L)-738
 USS LCI(L)-739
 USS LCI(L)-740
 USS LCI(L)-741
 USS LCI(L)-742
 USS LCI(L)-743
 USS LCI(L)-744
 USS LCI(L)-745
 USS LCI(L)-746
 USS LCI(L)-747
 USS LCI(L)-748
 USS LCI(L)-749
 USS LCI(L)-750
 USS LCI(L)-751
 USS LCI(L)-752
 USS LCI(L)-753
 USS LCI(L)-754
 USS LCI(L)-755
 USS LCI(L)-756
 USS LCI(L)-757
 USS LCI(L)-758
 USS LCI(L)-759
 USS LCI(L)-760
 USS LCI(L)-761
 USS LCI(L)-762
 USS LCI(L)-763
 USS LCI(L)-764
 USS LCI(L)-765
 USS LCI(L)-766
 USS LCI(L)-767
 USS LCI(L)-768
 USS LCI(L)-769
 USS LCI(L)-770
 USS LCI(L)-771
 USS LCI(L)-772
 USS LCI(L)-773
 USS LCI(L)-774
 USS LCI(L)-775
 USS LCI(L)-776
 USS LCI(L)-777
 USS LCI(L)-778
 USS LCI(L)-779
 USS LCI(L)-780
 LCI(L)-781 cancelled 23 June 1944
 USS LCI(L)-782
 USS LCI(L)-783
 USS LCI(L)-784
 USS LCI(L)-785
 USS LCI(L)-786
 USS LCI(L)-787
 USS LCI(L)-788
 USS LCI(L)-789
 USS LCI(L)-790
 USS LCI(L)-791
 USS LCI(L)-792
 USS LCI(L)-793
 USS LCI(L)-794
 USS LCI(L)-795
 USS LCI(L)-796
 USS LCI(L)-797
 USS LCI(L)-798
 USS LCI(L)-799
 USS LCI(L)-800
 USS LCI(L)-801
 USS LCI(L)-802
 USS LCI(L)-803
 USS LCI(L)-804
 USS LCI(L)-805
 USS LCI(L)-806
 USS LCI(L)-807
 USS LCI(L)-808
 USS LCI(L)-809
 USS LCI(L)-810
 USS LCI(L)-811
 USS LCI(L)-812
 USS LCI(L)-813
 USS LCI(L)-814
 USS LCI(L)-815
 USS LCI(L)-816
 USS LCI(L)-817
 USS LCI(L)-818
 USS LCI(L)-819
 USS LCI(L)-820
 USS LCI(L)-821
 LCI(L)-822 to LCI(L)-837 cancelled 19 August 1944
 LCI(L)-838 to LCI(L)-844 cancelled 5 June 1944
 LCI(L)-845 to LCI(L)-859 cancelled 23 June 1944
 LCI(L)-860 to LCI(L)-865 cancelled 5 June 1944
 USS LCI(L)-866
 USS LCI(L)-867
 USS LCI(L)-868
 USS LCI(L)-869
 USS LCI(L)-870
 USS LCI(L)-871
 USS LCI(L)-872
 USS LCI(L)-873
 USS LCI(L)-874
 USS LCI(L)-875
 USS LCI(L)-876
 USS LCI(L)-877
 USS LCI(L)-878
 USS LCI(L)-879
 USS LCI(L)-880
 USS LCI(L)-881
 USS LCI(L)-882
 USS LCI(L)-883
 USS LCI(L)-884
 LCI(L)-885 to LCI(L)-901 cancelled 19 August 1944
 LCI(L)-902 to LCI(L)-928 cancelled 5 June 1944
 LCI(L)-929 to LCI(L)-942 cancelled 23 June 1944
 USS LCI(L)-943
 USS LCI(L)-944
 USS LCI(L)-945
 USS LCI(L)-946
 USS LCI(L)-947
 USS LCI(L)-948
 USS LCI(L)-949
 USS LCI(L)-950
 USS LCI(L)-951
 USS LCI(L)-952
 USS LCI(L)-953
 USS LCI(L)-954
 USS LCI(L)-955
 USS LCI(L)-956
 USS LCI(L)-957
 USS LCI(L)-958
 USS LCI(L)-959
 USS LCI(L)-960
 USS LCI(L)-961
 USS LCI(L)-962
 USS LCI(L)-963
 USS LCI(L)-964
 USS LCI(L)-965
 USS LCI(L)-966
 USS LCI(L)-967
 USS LCI(L)-968
 USS LCI(L)-969
 USS LCI(L)-970
 USS LCI(L)-971
 USS LCI(L)-972
 USS LCI(L)-973
 USS LCI(L)-974
 USS LCI(L)-975
 USS LCI(L)-976
 USS LCI(L)-977
 USS LCI(L)-978
 USS LCI(L)-979
 USS LCI(L)-980
 USS LCI(L)-981
 USS LCI(L)-982
 USS LCI(L)-983
 USS LCI(L)-984
 USS LCI(L)-985
 USS LCI(L)-986
 USS LCI(L)-987
 USS LCI(L)-988
 USS LCI(L)-989
 USS LCI(L)-990
 USS LCI(L)-991
 USS LCI(L)-992
 USS LCI(L)-993
 USS LCI(L)-994
 USS LCI(L)-995
 USS LCI(L)-996
 USS LCI(L)-997
 USS LCI(L)-998
 USS LCI(L)-999
 USS LCI(L)-1000
 USS LCI(L)-1001
 USS LCI(L)-1002
 USS LCI(L)-1003
 USS LCI(L)-1004
 USS LCI(L)-1005
 USS LCI(L)-1006
 USS LCI(L)-1007
 USS LCI(L)-1008
 USS LCI(L)-1009
 USS LCI(L)-1010
 USS LCI(L)-1011
 USS LCI(L)-1012
 USS LCI(L)-1013
 USS LCI(L)-1014
 USS LCI(L)-1015
 USS LCI(L)-1016
 USS LCI(L)-1017
 USS LCI(L)-1018
 USS LCI(L)-1019
 USS LCI(L)-1020
 USS LCI(L)-1021
 USS LCI(L)-1022
 USS LCI(L)-1023
 USS LCI(L)-1024
 USS LCI(L)-1025
 USS LCI(L)-1026
 USS LCI(L)-1027
 USS LCI(L)-1028
 USS LCI(L)-1029
 USS LCI(L)-1030
 USS LCI(L)-1031
 USS LCI(L)-1032
 USS LCI(L)-1033
 LCI(L)-1034 to LCI(L)-1051 cancelled 19 June 1944
 USS LCI(L)-1052
 USS LCI(L)-1053
 USS LCI(L)-1054
 USS LCI(L)-1055
 USS LCI(L)-1056
 USS LCI(L)-1057
 USS LCI(L)-1058
 USS LCI(L)-1059
 USS LCI(L)-1060
 USS LCI(L)-1061
 USS LCI(L)-1062
 USS LCI(L)-1063
 USS LCI(L)-1064
 USS LCI(L)-1065
 USS LCI(L)-1066
 USS LCI(L)-1067
 USS LCI(L)-1068
 USS LCI(L)-1069
 USS LCI(L)-1070
 USS LCI(L)-1071
 USS LCI(L)-1072
 USS LCI(L)-1073
 USS LCI(L)-1074
 USS LCI(L)-1075
 USS LCI(L)-1076
 USS LCI(L)-1077
 USS LCI(L)-1078
 USS LCI(L)-1079
 USS LCI(L)-1080
 USS LCI(L)-1081
 USS LCI(L)-1082
 USS LCI(L)-1083
 USS LCI(L)-1084
 USS LCI(L)-1085
 USS LCI(L)-1086
 USS LCI(L)-1087
 USS LCI(L)-1088
 USS LCI(L)-1089
 USS LCI(L)-1090
 USS LCI(L)-1091
 USS LCI(L)-1092
 USS LCI(L)-1093
 USS LCI(L)-1094
 USS LCI(L)-1095
 USS LCI(L)-1096
 USS LCI(L)-1097
 USS LCI(L)-1098
 LCI(L)-1099 to LCI-(L)-1139 cancelled 19 August 1944

Sources

Lists of ships of the United States
Landing craft of the United States Navy